This page lists the rosters, by season, of the UCI Women's Team, .

2016

2015

As of 10 March 2015. Ages as of 1 January 2015.

2014

Ages as of 1 January 2014.

2013

Ages as of 1 January 2013.

2012

Ages as of 1 January 2012.

2011

Ages as of 1 January 2011.

References

Lists of cyclists by team